The Boy's Doin' It is the seventeenth studio album by South African trumpeter Hugh Masekela. It was recorded in New York City and in Lagos, Nigeria, and released in June 1975 via Casablanca Records label. The album was re-released on CD in 1998 on Verve Records with six additional tracks.

Reception
John Bush of Allmusic noted: "Recorded in Lagos, Nigeria and dedicated to Fela Kuti, The Boy's Doin' It has six extended jams, each of which does an excellent job of playing off deep grooves against ensemble vocals and catchy hooks, with plenty of room for Masekela's own trumpet and every note polished to a fine '70s sheen. It didn't matter what type of music fan you were: pop, disco, funk, world music, and any but the most hidebound jazz purist could get into these tracks."

Track listing

Personnel
Band
 Hugh Masekela – horns, vocals, producer 
 O.J. Ekemode – horns, vocals
 Kwasi "Rocki" Dzidzornu – congas 
 Papa Frankie Todd – drums (traps)
 Yaw Opoku – electric bass, vocals
 Gboyega Adelaja – electric piano 
 Stanley Todd Kwesi – guitar, vocals 
 Odinga "Guy" Warren – shekere, bells, vocals
 Okyerema Asante – talking drum, vocals

Production
Rik Pekkonen – engineer 
Doug Sax  – mastering
Stewart Levine – producer

Notes
This album is dedicated to Fela Ransome-Kuti. Special thanks to the women of the world.

References

External links

1975 albums
Hugh Masekela albums
Albums produced by Stewart Levine
Casablanca Records albums